Many Rings is an album by the American jazz guitarist Joe Morris, recorded in 1999 and released on the Knitting Factory label. He leads an experimental quartet featuring bassoonist Karen Borca, saxophonist Rob Brown and accordionist  Andrea Parkins.

Reception

In his review for AllMusic, Alex Henderson states: "This is hardly a session in which the quartet states the theme and the players take turns blowing--when Morris is soloing, you never know who will jump in and respond with some blowing of his or her own."

The Penguin Guide to Jazz observes that "the title piece is the most convincing representation of its unconventional sonority, and some care has been taken to register all the elements with something like democracy."

In his review for JazzTimes, Larry Appelbaum states: "Everything is rooted in the improviser's collective ability to listen and create spontaneous harmony, pulse and structure."

Track listing
All compositions by Joe Morris
 "Drawn to the Magnet"  – 5:52
 "Many Rings" – 14:25
 "First Appearance" – 4:25 
 "Chapel Level" – 10:35
 "Motion to the Air"  – 3:28
 "Situation to Be In" – 5:15
 "Small Cycle" – 11:06 
 "Blue Spots Here" – 7:31

Personnel
Joe Morris - guitar
Karen Borca – bassoon 
Rob Brown – alto sax, flute
Andrea Parkins – accordion, sampler

References

1999 albums
Joe Morris (guitarist) albums
Knitting Factory Records albums